The Goldfields region of Victoria is a region commonly used but typically defined in both historical geography and tourism geography (in particular heritage tourism). The region is also known as the Victorian Golden Triangle.

Description  

It takes in a specific area of North Central Victoria, the major cities of Ballarat and Bendigo as well as smaller centres including Daylesford, Castlemaine and Maryborough.  It extends as far north as Inglewood and St Arnaud.  It encroaches on the Western District near Ararat.  Other significant towns include Maldon, Creswick, Clunes, Avoca and Buninyong.  

Although the region has a strong association with the Victorian gold rush there are, however, significant towns associated with the gold rush and gold mining located outside of this region - notable examples include Warburton, Walhalla, Warrandyte, Chiltern and Beechworth.  The goldfields region is more strongly linked to the impact of the Victorian Gold Rush than the discovery of gold in Victoria.  

As a result of the gold rush, the region contains many old buildings, including celebrated examples of Victorian architecture, some of which are heritage listed, while others have fallen into disrepair and become derelict. Many of the towns were far larger during the Gold Rush than they are now, and there are some examples of ghost towns in the region.  Major tourism icons include Sovereign Hill, Eureka Stockade site and the Bendigo Talking Tram. The region is also associated with the origins of Australian rules football; Tom Wills, one of the game's founders, grew up outside present-day Moyston, the self-proclaimed "Birthplace of Australian Football". Some of the earliest clubs were also established in the region.

Demographically, the population of the region is approximately 244,900  The region has a well-defined road tourist route.  The area retains a significant gold mining industry and remains a popular for fossicking.

The Goldfields region is also associated as a wine growing region with a large number of established vineyards and popular wineries.  An important ecosystem associated with the region is the Box-Ironbark forest, now much fragmented and cleared but still important for the conservation of many birds and other animals.

See also 

 Victorian gold rush
 Jim Crow goldfield

Gallery

References

External links 
 Goldfields Guide
 Goldfields, Victoria at Visit Victoria

Regions of Victoria (Australia)
Geography of Victoria (Australia) 
Mining in Victoria (Australia) 
Grampians (region)